The Lookalike is a 1990 American made-for-television thriller film directed by Gary Nelson based on a novel by Kate Wilhelm and starring Melissa Gilbert and Diane Ladd. It premiered on USA Network on December 12, 1990 and was released on VHS in 1991.

Plot
Melissa Gilbert stars as a woman grieving about her child who she lost in an accident, when she one day recognizes her daughter in a girl.

Cast
 Melissa Gilbert as Gina/Jennifer
 Diane Ladd as Mary Helen Needam
 Frances Lee McCain as Dr. Stamos
 Jason Scott Lee as John "Charlie" Chan
 Thaao Penghlis as Nikos Lissandros
Bo Brinkman as Stuart
April Stevens as Young Gina, Jennifer & Sarah
C.K. Bibby as Jack Needam

References

External links

1990 television films
1990 films
1990 thriller films
USA Network original films
Films based on American novels
Films directed by Gary Nelson
1990s English-language films
American thriller television films
1990s American films